The Royal Cup NLB Montenegro is a tournament for professional female tennis players played on outdoor clay courts. The event is classified as a $25,000 ITF Women's Circuit tournament. It has been held in Donji Kokoti, Podgorica, Montenegro, since 2004. It was previously a $50,000 event on the circuit but was downgraded in 2013.

Past finals

Singles

Doubles

Record

Titles by player
Since first edition of Podgorica tour, Czech player Renata Voráčová is the only participant which won the singles tournament twice (2009, 2012). Among the players which won title in singles and in doubles are Andrea Petković, Dijana Stojić, Irina-Camelia Begu and Stephanie Vogt. Below is the list of players which won at least two tournaments in singles and doubles.

Titles by country
By now, tennis players from 16 different countries won the trophy in singles or doubles competition at Royal Cup NLB Montenegro. Most successful were players from Romania, which won five titles. Additionally, more than two titles won players from Bosnia and Herzegovina, Czech Republic, Serbia, Germany, Croatia and Italy. Argentina is the only country out of Europe whose players won the trophy.

WIN - winners; RUN - runners up

External links
 Official website
 ITF search

ITF Women's World Tennis Tour
Clay court tennis tournaments
Tennis tournaments in Montenegro
Recurring sporting events established in 2004